Jo Bauer (born 21 July 1961) is the FIA Formula One Technical Delegate at Grand Prix races. Bauer's job is to assess all the cars at races to ensure that they are within the regulations and he has a team of FIA and local assistants to help him at each race. He took over the job from Charlie Whiting in 1997 when Whiting was appointed as Race Director.

Bauer is an automotive engineer who studied at the Rheinisch-Westfälische Technische Hochschule in Aachen, Germany. After finishing his bachelor's degree Bauer went on to get a Masters while working with the automotive engineering firm FEV Motorentechnik GmbH

References

Profile at grandprix.com

Formula One engineers
German motorsport people
1961 births
Living people